The Lightweight competition was the fourth lightest class featured at the 2011 World Amateur Boxing Championships, held at the Heydar Aliyev Sports and Exhibition Complex.

Medalists

Seeds

  Domenico Valentino (semifinals)
  Albert Selimov (first round)
  Yasniel Toledo (Second Place)
  Vasyl Lomachenko (champion)
  Eugen Burhard (third round)
  Fatih Keleş (first round)
  David Joyce (third round)
  Elvin Isayev (second round)
  Abdelkader Chadi (second round)

Draw

Finals

Round of 128

Top Half

Section 1

Section 2

Bottom Half

Section 3

Section 4

External links
Draw

Lightweight